Misha Radovic (born in Belgrade, SR Serbia, Yugoslavia at September 12, 1961) is a Serbian former football player and manager. He played with FK Vardar in the 1981–82 Yugoslav First League before coming to Australia in 1989. He is a founder of Soccer Sydney Academy in Australia. Misha has a UEFA Pro Licence and is therefore able to coach at the highest levels of World soccer. Together with ex AC.Milan midfielder Andrea Icardi, Misha was head coach of AC Milan Academy in 2009. In October 2010, he was appointed manager of the Indonesia Super League team Pelita Jaya, owned by Indonesian billionaire Nirwan Bakrie. In April 2012, he was appointed as manager of another major team in Indonesia, Persisam Putra Samarinda. In this role, Misha saved the club from relegation. In October 2021, Misha came to Persis Solo, owned by Mr. Kaesang Pangarep, Mr. Erick Thohir, and Mr. Kevin Nugroho. As a Technical Director, he successfully help Persis Solo to become Champions of League2 and to promote club to Liga1 2022, after 14 long years.

Coaching Licence

Coaching Accreditations
UEFA Pro Licence
UEFA "A" Licence
Football Association of Serbia "A" Licence
Football Federation Australia "A" Licence
Football Federation Australia Pro Licence

Licence Upgrade
 2002 – Youth Coaching Licence N.S.W
 2003 – Intermediate Licence N.S.W
 2003 – Senior Coaching Licence N.S.W
 2008 – UEFA "B" Accreditation Serbia
 2009 – UEFA "A" Accreditation Serbia
 2010 – Coach upgrade Nagoya Grampus, Japan under tuition of Pixie Stojkovic & Bosko Djurovski
2013 – UEFA Pro Licence

Honours

Player Achievement 
 Champion of Europe 1979 with Yugoslavia U19
 Youth Champion of Yugoslavia 1979/1980

Coaching Achievement
Queens Park Soccer Club, Australia

 Grand final Champions: 1

Persis Solo
Champion of Liga 2 2021
Surabaya Cup Winners 2022

References

External links
 Soccer Sydney
 Inside Josh Kennedy's Nagoya

1961 births
Living people
Footballers from Belgrade
Serbian footballers
Serbian football managers
FK Vardar players
Yugoslav First League players
Bonnyrigg White Eagles FC players
Association football defenders
Association football midfielders